Graeme Goldsworthy (born 7 September 1934) is an Australian evangelical Anglican theologian specialising in the Old Testament and biblical theology. His most significant work is a trilogy: Gospel and Kingdom, Gospel and Wisdom, and The Gospel in Revelation. Goldsworthy has authored several other books including According to Plan: The Unfolding Revelation of God in the Bible, and  Preaching the Whole Bible as Christian Scripture. He holds a Master of Arts degree from the University of Cambridge in England, and Master of Theology and Doctor of Philosophy degrees from Union Theological Seminary, Richmond, Virginia (now named Union Presbyterian Seminary).

Goldsworthy is best known for his motif of "God's people in God's place under God's rule." He has been influential across the world, but especially in the Anglican Diocese of Sydney. Michael Jensen notes that, along with that of Donald Robinson and Bill Dumbrell, Goldsworthy's work "has been crucial for shaping how Sydney Anglicans think about and preach from the Bible." Eric Brian Watkins suggests that it has "done much to vitalize interest" in redemptive-historical preaching and hermeneutics. Goldworthy's approach heavily influenced The Big Picture Story Bible.

Works

Books

 re-publication of Gospel and Kingdom, Gospel and Wisdom and The Gospel in Revelation

Selected articles

References

1934 births
Australian Anglican priests
Australian Anglican theologians
Evangelical Anglican theologians
Living people
Academic staff of Moore Theological College